The Robert Stephenson was an early, passenger train, tender locomotive operated by the Leipzig–Dresden Railway Company or LDE.

The locomotive was delivered to the LDE in 1838 by Robert Stephenson & Co., Newcastle upon Tyne, England, with factory number 205. It was retired sometime between 1857 and 1860.

See also 
 Royal Saxon State Railways
 List of Saxon locomotives and railbuses
 Leipzig–Dresden Railway Company

Sources 

 
 

2-2-2 locomotives
Locomotives of Saxony
Robert Stephenson and Company locomotives
Early steam locomotives
Standard gauge locomotives of Germany
Railway locomotives introduced in 1838

Passenger locomotives